Melisande is a painting by the Austrian painter Marianne Stokes. It was painted with tempera on canvas, 1895–1898. It is currently at the Wallraf-Richartz Museum in Cologne, Germany. It depicts a scene from the play  
Pelléas and Mélisande by the Belgian playwright Maurice Maeterlinck.

References
 

1890s paintings
Paintings by Marianne Stokes
Collections of the Wallraf–Richartz Museum
Water in art